Heeze-Leende is a municipality in the southern Netherlands, near Eindhoven. It is known for Heeze Castle (Kasteel Heeze).

The spoken language is "Heeze-en-Leendes", a distinct dialect within the East Brabantian dialect group and is very similar to colloquial Dutch.

Population centres 
Heeze
Leende
Sterksel

Topography

Dutch Topographic map of the municipality of Heeze-Leende, June 2015

Notable people 
 Jan Moninckx (ca.1656 in Leende - 1714) a Dutch botanical artist and painter
 Laurentius Nicolaas Deckers (1883 in Heeze – 1978) a Dutch politician, diplomat and agronomist.
 Thomas Horsten (born 1994 in Heeze) a Dutch professional footballer

Gallery

References

External links

Official website

 
Municipalities of North Brabant
Municipalities of the Netherlands established in 1997